Tephritis hurvitzi is a species of tephritid or fruit flies in the genus Tephritis of the family Tephritidae.

Distribution
Greece, Turkey, Cyprus, Israel, Iran, Uzbekistan.

References

Tephritinae
Insects described in 1981
Diptera of Asia